Martin John Griffin (September 2, 1901 – November 19, 1951) was a pitcher in Major League Baseball who played briefly for the Boston Red Sox during the  season. Listed at 6' 2", 200 lb., Griffin batted and threw right-handed. He was born in San Francisco, California.

In one season career, Griffin posted a 0-3 record with a 5.02 ERA in 11 appearances, including three starts nine strikeouts, 17 walks, 42 hits allowed, and 37⅔ innings of work.  

Griffin died at the age of 50 in Los Angeles, California.

See also
1928 Boston Red Sox season
Boston Red Sox all-time roster

External links
Baseball Reference
Retrosheet

Boston Red Sox players
Major League Baseball pitchers
Baseball players from California
1901 births
1951 deaths